Babbouche is a dish originating in Morocco whose main ingredient is snails. The snails are cooked slowly in broth that contains ingredients such as thyme, aniseed, gum arabic, mint, caraway, and liquorice.

The dish is sometimes prepared and served as a soup.

References

External links
 Chnowa el ftour: "Chakchouket Babbouche". Shemsfm.net. – includes an image of babbouche

Gastropods and humans
Arab cuisine
Moroccan cuisine
Snail dishes
Moroccan soups